The 18th Golden Raspberry Awards were held on March 22, 1998, at the Hollywood Roosevelt Hotel to recognize the worst the movie industry had to offer in 1997. This year, the film with the most nominations was Batman & Robin with 11, followed by Speed 2: Cruise Control with eight nominations, Anaconda with six nominations, The Postman with five nominations and Fire Down Below with four nominations. The film winning the most awards was The Postman, with all five categories for which it was nominated.

Brian Helgeland, co-screenwriter of the Razzie-winning The Postman, also received the Academy Award for Best Adapted Screenplay for L.A. Confidential in 1998. Helgeland became the second person, after composer Alan Menken in 1993, to receive a Razzie and Oscar in the same year, a feat not repeated until actress Sandra Bullock in 2010.

Awards and nominations

Films with multiple nominations 
These films received multiple nominations:

See also

 1997 in film
 70th Academy Awards
 55th Golden Globe Awards
 4th Screen Actors Guild Awards
 51st British Academy Film Awards

References

External links
 

Golden Raspberry Awards
Golden Raspberry Awards ceremonies
1998 in American cinema
1998 in California
March 1998 events in the United States
Golden Raspberry